Pascal Touzeau (born 1969) is a French dancer and choreographer of contemporary dance.

Touzeau studied dance at the conservatoire de Bordeaux. Touzeau became choreographer in Germany, France, Sweden and the Netherlands before being appointed head of the Ballet Carmen Roche in Madrid (2005 to 2006).

Touzeau has been director of the Staatstheater Mainz since 2009.

References

External links 
 Pascal Touzeau
 Midsummer night´s dream - Cie Alienorballet - Ch.Pascal Touzeau (YouTube)

1969 births
Living people
Entertainers from Bordeaux
20th-century French dancers
21st-century French dancers
French choreographers
Contemporary dance
Conservatoire de Bordeaux alumni